Minimum Credible Deterrence (MCD; officially named N-deterrence) is the defence and strategic principle on which the atomic weapons programme of Pakistan is based. This doctrine is not a part of the nuclear doctrine, which is designed for the use of the atomic weapons in a full-scale declared war if the conditions of the doctrine are surpassed. Instead, the policy of the Minimum Credible Deterrence falls under minimal deterrence as an inverse to the Mutually Assured Destruction (MAD), which is widely regarded as designed to dissuade India from taking any military actions against Pakistan, as it did in 1971, when Pakistan started the war. (see: Indo-Pakistani war of 1971) Pakistan refuses to adopt No first use policy, while the other regional powers India and China had adopted the policy. Pakistan's foreign minister Shamshad Ahmad had warned that if Pakistan is ever invaded or attacked, it will use "any weapon in its arsenal" to defend itself.

Developmental history

The comprehensive nuclear weapons policy was addressed by populist prime minister Zulfikar Ali Bhutto in a vision for the country to "walk tall" in global politics. Maintaining equality on every level of scientific development with India was a primary motivation for his government. Domestically, the popular support helped Bhutto to consolidate the political and economical aspects of atomic bomb projects and the control of the Pakistan military in civilian hands. This led the creation of formation of defence mechanism systematic programmes, known as National Command Authority (NCA), Joint Special Forces (JSF) under the control of the Joint Chiefs of Staff Committee which is led by its designated Chairman. Externally, the nuclear status was a way to boost Pakistan's prestige, importance and influence on among the friendly and Muslim nations, including rich Gulf monarchies.

On 20 May 1999, in his address at the National Defence University (NDU), Prime minister Nawaz Sharif used the term "minimum credible deterrence" while speaking about Pakistan's nuclear stance. There, the Prime minister (even the government at present now), made cleared Pakistan's nuclear declaratory statements that India is regarded as its sole nuclear adversary and thus the focus of its nuclear deterrent.

The MCD theory is based on the principles of the deterrence theory and offers the idea of the achieving the second strike capability. The MCD theory is effectively, an ideal form of Nash equilibrium (named after mathematician John Forbes Nash), in which both India and Pakistan, once armed, has no rational incentive to either initiate a conflict, or to disarm.

Promulgation and enforcement
The policy framework was announced by Prime minister of Pakistan (at that time) Nawaz Sharif after ordering to perform country's first atomic tests (see the operations: Chagai-I and Chagai-II) in 1998 as part of tit-for-tat policy. In end of 1998, the doctrine and organisation began to be redesigned, and a proceeded to a full-scope scientific, economical and defence review, involving key country's institutions, to develop and test ideas and concepts. The studies and policy were studied at the National Defence University (NDU), National University of Sciences and Technology, Institute of Defence and Strategic Studies (IDSS) and various others.

Since the public atomic tests in 1998, Pakistan Government has adopted considerable recommendations and suggestions to think through its nuclear doctrine, and to integrate the nuclear power dimension into its defence strategy. The definition of potential thresholds has been refined, at least in public statements by Pakistani officials. According to one reliable source, the country adopted a three-point nuclear policy in early 2001 as part of the minimum credible deterrence. The most authoritative of these statements are provided by the officials of the Atomic Command Authority, in the form of four thresholds which were first mentioned by Khalid Kidwai in late 2001.

Policy statements

The theory of "Minimum Credible Deterrence (MCD)" has been frequently being interpreted by the various government-in-time of effect of Pakistan. Although the MCD theory was officially adopted in 1998 as part of Pakistan's defence theory, on the other hand, the theory has had been interpreted by the government since in 1972. On military perspective, for instance, the Pakistan Air Force (PAF), has retrospectively contended that "MCD is not view to enter into a "nuclear race", but to follow a policy of "peaceful co-existence" in the region, it cannot remain oblivious to the developments in South Asia." The Pakistan Government officials have repeatedly emphasized that the MCD is a defence theory, a doctrine that is based on maintaining a balance to safeguard its sovereignty and ensure peace in the region.

In 1974, Bhutto launched a more aggressive and serious diplomatic offensive on the United States and the Western world over the nuclear issues. Writing to the world and Western leaders, Bhutto made it clear and maintained:

Rationale and persuasion

The senior officials, economists, game theorists, and strategists affiliated with Pakistan's government has persuaded multiple times for maintaining the Minimum Credible Deterrence. The government officials points out that "Indo-US nuclear deal as well as cooperation in conventional field is likely to grow in India's favour, thus accelerating arms race in the region". Therefore, maintaining "minimum credible nuclear deterrence" would require Pakistan to review its nuclear policy. The government officials maintained that while Pakistan will continue to act with responsibility avoiding an arms race, it will not remain oblivious to the imperative of maintaining "minimum credible nuclear deterrence".

The unnamed official at the Islamabad Policy Research Institute (IPRI) stated that "the nuclear weapons programme has been exclusively driven by security considerations to ensure the survival and very existence of the state". In 2012, Prime minister Yousaf Raza Gillani stated the comprehensive policy and quoted:

In 2010, a high ranking science minister of government of Pakistan publicly announced at the international conference on science after delegating foreign ambassadors and scientists from all over the world: "Our nuclear capability is purely for defensive purposes, first believing in peaceful co-existence and reconciliation and will always strive for peace and prosperity in our region".

See also
Nuclear doctrine of Pakistan
Zulfikar Ali Bhutto
Nawaz Sharif
Indo-Pakistani war of 1971
Pakistan and weapons of mass destruction
Nuclear strategy
Peaceful coexistence

References

Concept bibliography

Credited scholarly articles

History of the foreign relations of Pakistan
Policies of Pakistan
History of Pakistan
Nuclear strategy
Nuclear weapons programme of Pakistan
Continuity of government in Pakistan
Military doctrines of Pakistan